The Armed Forces DNA Identification Laboratory (AFDIL) is a forensics laboratory specializing in DNA profiling run by the United States Armed Forces and located at the Dover Air Force Base, Delaware.

It is part of the Armed Forces Medical Examiner System.

AFDIL stores refrigerated DNA samples from all current active duty and reserve personnel.  However, almost all casualty identifications are effected using fingerprints from military ID card records (live scan fingerprints are recorded at the time such cards are issued). When friction ridge skin is not available from deceased military personnel, DNA and dental records are used to confirm identity.

External links
www.afmes.mil
Department of Defense DNA Operations 

Laboratories in the United States
Forensics organizations
Military medicine in the United States